Kamal bin Mat Salih (born 1946) is a Malaysian economist, physician, policy advisor, academic administrator and politician. He served as a Member of the Malaysian Parliament for Wangsa Maju from 1995 to 1999.

He earned B.A. (Hons) from Monash University and a PhD from the University of Pennsylvania in 1973. He was a Professor, Dean and Deputy Vice-Chancellor at the University of Science, Malaysia between 1973 and 1985. From 1986 to 1994, he was Executive Director of the Malaysian Institute of Economic Research. He also served as a member of the Prime Minister's Economic Panel in 1981–1986, advising Prime Minister Mahathir Mohamad. He was also a member of the Malaysian Business Council 1991–1996 and was Rapporteur-General of the first National Economic Consultative Council 1989–1991.

He co-founded the International Medical University (IMU) in 1993 and served as its first President until 2001 and as Executive Chairman until 2003. After leaving IMU, he served as economic advisor to the National Implementation Task Force, a high-level group of experts established by the government of Abdullah Ahmad Badawi. He is now Professor of Economics and Development Studies at the University of Malaya.

Honours
D.Litt (Hon), Dundee
D.Laws, honoris causa, Dalhousie
D.Science (Hon), Thomas Jefferson
D.Science (Hon), Strathclyde
Companion of the Order of the Defender of State of Penang

Honours of Malaysia
  : Officer of the Order of the Defender of the Realm (K.M.N.) (1980)
  : Companion of the Order of the Defender of the Realm (J.M.N.) (1985)
  : Commander of the Order of Loyalty to the Crown of Malaysia (P.S.M.) (2008)

References

Living people
Malaysian economists
Academic staff of the International Medical University
Academic staff of the University of Malaya
1946 births
Officers of the Order of the Defender of the Realm
Companions of the Order of the Defender of the Realm
Commanders of the Order of Loyalty to the Crown of Malaysia